Port-au-Prince Bay is a bay located in the Gulf of Gonâve in Haiti, at the bottom of which lies the vast plain of the Cul-de-Sac and the country's capital, Port-au-Prince alongside its metropolitan area. It is connected to the gulf via two inlets located on either side of the island of Gonâve: the Canal de Saint-Marc to the north of it and the Canal de la Gonâve to the south.

Geography

The Grise, Bâtarde, Froide, and Momance Rivers as well as the Boucanbrou Canal flow into Port-au-Prince Bay.

History
On 13 January 2010, in the aftermath of the 2010 Haiti earthquake, the U.S. Coast Guard cutter Forward arrived and began running air-traffic control from Port-au-Prince Bay.

References

Bays of Haiti
Port-au-Prince